The 2000 FIBA Diamond Ball was a basketball tournament held in Hong Kong, China, from September 2 until September 6, 2000. The FIBA Diamond Ball was an official international basketball tournament organised by FIBA, held every Olympic year prior to the Olympics. It was the 1st edition of the FIBA Diamond Ball. The six participating teams were Angola, Argentina, Australia, host China, Canada and FR Yugoslavia.

Participating teams

 – African champions
 – Olympics hosts (New Zealand were Oceania champions)
 – Americas runners-up (USA were Olympic & Americas champions)
 – Asian champions
 – European champions
 FR Yugoslavia – World champions

Preliminary round

Group A
*All times are China Standard Time (UTC+8).

|}

Group B
*All times are China Standard Time (UTC+8).

|}

Final round
*All times are China Standard Time (UTC+8).

5th place

Third place

Final

Final standings
The final standings per FIBA official website:

See also 
 Acropolis Tournament
 Basketball at the Summer Olympics
 FIBA Basketball World Cup
 FIBA Asia Cup
 Adecco Cup
 Marchand Continental Championship Cup
 Belgrade Trophy
 Stanković Cup
 William Jones Cup

References

External links 
2000 FIBA Diamond Ball Archive

Diamond Ball
Recurring sporting events established in 2000